Yin Hejun (born 14 January 1963) is a Chinese politician, currently serving as vice president of the Chinese Academy of Sciences.

He was a representative of the 19th National Congress of the Chinese Communist Party and an alternate member of the 19th Central Committee of the Chinese Communist Party. He is a representative of the 20th National Congress of the Chinese Communist Party and a member of the 20th Central Committee of the Chinese Communist Party.

Biography
Yin was born in Gujiao County (now Gujiao), Shanxi, on 14 January 1963. He graduated from Taiyuan Institute of Technology (now Taiyuan University of Technology) in 1983 and Xidian University in 1989. He joined the Chinese Communist Party (CCP) in June 1983. He earned his doctor's degree in electromagnetic field and microwave technology from the Chinese Academy of Sciences in 1995.

After graduating in March 1995, Yin stayed and worked at the Institute of Electronics, Chinese Academy of Sciences, where he was promoted to executive deputy director in August 1999 and to director in August 2001. After a short term as director of the High Technology Research and Development Bureau of the Chinese Academy of Sciences in January 2008, he rose to become vice president of the Chinese Academy of Sciences.

In November 2015, Yin was transferred to the central government and appointed vice minister of Science and Technology.

In March 2017, Yin was admitted to member of the Standing Committee of the CCP Beijing Municipal Committee, the capital city's top authority. He was vice mayor of Beijing in April 2017, in addition to serving as party secretary of the CCP Zhongguancun Management Committee.

In October 2018, Yin was made deputy party secretary of the neighboring city Tianjin and was admitted to member of the Standing Committee of the CCP Tianjin Municipal Committee, the city's top authority.

In November 2020, Yin was recalled to the Chinese Academy of Sciences and appointed vice president (ministerial level) for the second time.

References

1963 births
Living people
People from Gujiao
Taiyuan University of Technology alumni
Xidian University alumni
People's Republic of China politicians from Shanxi
Chinese Communist Party politicians from Shanxi
Alternate members of the 19th Central Committee of the Chinese Communist Party
Members of the 20th Central Committee of the Chinese Communist Party